Antoine Valério (born 11 December 1999) is a French professional footballer who plays as a midfielder for  club Rodez.

Career
A youth product of Béglais, Valério lived in the United States for five years in his youth before returning to Béglais to finish his development and moved to Stade Bordelais in 2017. He made his professional debut with Nîmes in a 1–1 Ligue 1 tie with Amiens SC on 19 October 2019. On 28 October 2019, signed his first professional contract with Nîmes, agreeing to a three-year deal.

On 2 June 2022, Valério signed a three-year contract with Rodez.

References

External links
 
 

Living people
1999 births
Footballers from Bordeaux
Association football midfielders
French footballers
Nîmes Olympique players
Rodez AF players
Ligue 1 players
Ligue 2 players
Championnat National 2 players
Championnat National 3 players